Trevor Oliver Taylor (11 January 1958 – 19 January 2008) was a Jamaican-German singer, musician, music producer, and songwriter. He was best known as the original lead singer of the German band Bad Boys Blue. In later years, he adopted the stage name Supa T.

Early years
Trevor Taylor was born in 1958 in Montego Bay, Jamaica. At the age of 14, Taylor visited England for the first time. Besides music, young Trevor was interested in cooking, power lifting, and football. Trevor was a true rastaman, and his idol was Bob Marley. At the beginning of his career, Trevor played bass guitar in the British reggae band UB40 and also was a singer in little-known groups in Seychelles. In 1978, Trevor worked as a chef in a restaurant "Holiday Inn" in Birmingham, and then in Cologne restaurant "Stummel".

Bad Boys Blue
In 1984, Trevor Taylor joined the new group Bad Boys Blue where he was selected as the lead vocalist. He sang the leads on the 1985 hit song "You're A Woman". It was a real success for the band and it instantly reached Top 10 in many European music charts. In Germany, the single peaked at No. 8 and it did not leave the German Top 20 for four months. The same year, Bad Boys Blue released their first studio album, Hot Girls, Bad Boys, on which Trevor Taylor sang on all songs (except "L.O.V.E. In My Car"), just as he did on the band's second album, Heartbeat, which was released in 1986.

In 1987, while recording the single "Come Back And Stay", producers Tony Hendrik and Karin van Haaren decided to change the lead singer, and to subsequently make John McInerney the new front-man. These changes, in turn, created tension within the group which ultimately led to Trevor Taylor's departure, who understandably did not wish to accept his new sidelined role. A noteworthy fact is that Trevor Taylor did not leave the group right away following the switch, and stayed with the group for a whole year, during which he was incrementally phased out from his position of the front-man. During that transitional period his participation as the lead singer dropped first to 60% and then to 20% of songs sung on the 3rd and the 4th albums, respectively. That move was not incidental, for it was a key strategy implemented by the producers to ensure survivability and continuity of their project, that is to make sure in the public eye that both Taylor and McInerney were still present in the group, only that their respective positions had been switched, where the fans were now expected to become accustomed to seeing Taylor appear in the shadow of McInerney. Only after McInerney appeared on enough of new tracks as lead singer, Taylor could finally leave the group. This move was made possible by contractual obligations established by the Bad Boys Blue producers which legally prevented Trevor Taylor from exiting the band prematurely (that is, not until the transition period was completed), and therefore the producers were guaranteed to have a smooth continuation of their project.

After leaving Bad Boys Blue
After leaving the group, Trevor tried to act in films and participated in various musical projects, from trance to reggae. In 1990, the reggae project Street Noise released the single "Our Problem", where Trevor Taylor was the leading vocalist. In 1991, Trevor was a member of the band Temper Temper as a guitarist. For several years Trevor was a producer and vocalist in the German reggae band Umoya, which released three albums and six singles.

Since 1995, under the pseudonym Supa T, Taylor began recording with the band The Party Animals, releasing singles "My Dog", "Gotta Jump", "Be True", and "Love and Respect". The latter was the hit of the year in Spain and held top positions in the Spanish charts for a long time. All these compositions subsequently were featured in his first solo album, Reggae in the Pop House & Soul, released in 1998 by Vale Music. That same year, Trevor participated in the recording of the single "Harddrummer" by Chocolate Milk.

He later recorded singles for Mondo Club: a cover version of "Don't Worry, Be Happy", and "Sex Up My Life", which became the soundtrack for the television series "Heiße Tage – Wilde Nächte". In his later years, Trevor performed a lot with reggae groups Umoya and The Reggae Cracks. He also planned to release his second solo album, Second Life.

Trevor Taylor, aged 50, died of a heart attack at a hospital in Cologne. His second solo album is still officially unreleased.

Discography

Singles

Albums

References

External links
Umoya official website

1958 births
2008 deaths
Bandleaders
Jamaican musicians
Jamaican expatriates in Germany
People from Montego Bay
20th-century German musicians
20th-century German male musicians
Mercury Records artists